Sutton Common railway station is in Sutton Common in the London Borough of Sutton in South London. The station is served by Thameslink and Southern trains on the Sutton Loop Line. It is in Travelcard Zone 4. It has a single stepped entrance accessible from Sutton Common Road. It is the nearest rail station to the adjoining neighbourhood Benhilton via the footbridge at Angel Hill.

History
Parliamentary approval for a line from Wimbledon to Sutton had been obtained by the Wimbledon and Sutton Railway (W&SR) in 1910 but work had been delayed by World War I. From the W&SR's inception, the District Railway (DR) was a shareholder of the company and had rights to run trains over the line when built. In the 1920s, the Underground Electric Railways Company of London (UERL, precursor of London Underground) planned, through its ownership of the DR, to use part of the route for an extension of another of its lines, the City and South London Railway (C&SLR, now the Northern line), to Sutton. The SR objected and an agreement was reached that enabled the C&SLR to extend as far as Morden in exchange for the UERL giving up its rights over the W&SR route. The SR subsequently built the line, one of the last to be built in the London area.

In the original 1910 proposals the next station to the north was to be at Elm Farm and the next station to the south at Collingwood Road. In the 1920s W&SR and UERL proposals, Elm Farm and Collingwood Road stations were omitted and the next station to the north was South Morden and the next to the south was Cheam. When constructed by the SR, Morden South was constructed in a different location to South Morden and Cheam station was omitted. West Sutton was added. The station opened on 5 January 1930 when full services on the line were extended from South Merton.

In recent years, rebuilding has seen the small shed-like station building completely demolished. The platforms are directly accessed from the street via the stairs, with a ticket machine at street level.

Services
All services at Sutton Common are operated by Thameslink using  EMUs.

The typical off-peak service in trains per hour is:
 2 tph to 
 2 tph to 

Connections
London Buses routes 470 and S3 serve the station.

References

External links

Railway stations in the London Borough of Sutton
Former Southern Railway (UK) stations
Railway stations in Great Britain opened in 1930
Railway stations served by Govia Thameslink Railway
Proposed London Underground stations
Sutton, London